A Cellarful of Motown! is a series of compilation albums of Motown rarities, containing versions of known songs by alternative artists, as well as demos of songs that were not released at the time, but had been shelved for various reasons.

Compiled by Paul Nixon the series ran for 4 volumes before being cancelled by Universal Records. Some of them had failed to pass the selections by Motown executives, in other cases Motown's owner Berry Gordy had his personal reasons to withhold releases. Four examples out of many:
 "Danger, Heartbreak Dead Ahead" was a hit for The Marvelettes, but appears in a version by The Contours.
 Likewise, Smokey Robinsons "My Heart", once a minor hit for Carolyn Crawford, is in this compilation performed by Tammi Terrell.
 From Patrice Holloway only one single was released by Motown; two demos she made for the company appear in this compilation.
 The Spinners' original song "Too Late I Learned" was recorded but never released, not as a single nor as an album track

The series was revived for a fifth volume in September 2020, released by Universal subsidiary label Caroline Records.

Volume 1

Source: Classic Motown, Allmusic

Disc One

Disc Two

Volume 2

Source: Discogs, Allmusic

Disc one

Disc two

Volume 3

Source: Discogs, Allmusic

Disc one

Disc two

Volume 4

Source: Soulsource, Allmusic

Disc one

Disc two

References

2002 compilation albums
Motown compilation albums
Compilation album series
Record label compilation albums
Soul compilation albums
Pop compilation albums
Rhythm and blues compilation albums